Black and White is a 2008 Italian romantic comedy-drama film directed by Cristina Comencini. The film deals with race and inter-racial relationships when the married Carlo (Fabio Volo) falls in love with Nadine, the wife of his own wife's colleague.

Plot
Carlo Lodoli is a young computer technician, married to Elena, a cultural mediator. The couple have a daughter named Giovanna. One night at an information evening hosted by Elena's work, Carlo meets Nadine, a beautiful, rebellious woman and the wife of Elena's work colleague Bertrand, from Senegal. After the pair talk outside, Carlo slowly begins to fall in love with Nadine. He then suggests to Elena that they invite Nadine and her two children, Felicite and Christian, to Giovanna's birthday party. During the party, Carlo becomes fixated by Nadine. Later on having established their attraction for one another, Nadine asks Carlo to repair her computer in order to maintain contact. Eventually, Carlo later calls over to Nadine's house to repair her computer. When Carlo leaves, he suddenly knocks on the door and is invited in by Nadine. The pair then make love in Nadine's living room, and begin an affair. When their respective spouses discover the affair however, Carlo and Nadine are ejected from their homes. Carlo goes to live with his mother while Nadine is placed in the storage area of an apartment for women run by her sister Veronique. Carlo and Nadine then continue to see each other. However, after pressures from their respective races, Carlo and Nadine eventually return to their respective spouses. Sometime later, however, Carlo and Nadine meet again by chance at their old lovers rendezvous spot. Realising that they still love each other, Carlo and Nadine decide to remain together, despite the consequences they know they will face.

Cast
 Fabio Volo as Carlo 
 Ambra Angiolini as Elena 
 Aïssa Maïga as Nadine 
 Eriq Ebouaney as Bertrand 
 Katia Ricciarelli as Olga 
 Anna Bonaiuto as Adua 
 Franco Branciaroli as Alfonso 
 Teresa Saponangelo as Esmeralda 
 Billo Thiernothian as Ahamdou 
 Awa Ly as Veronique 
 Bob Messini as Dante

See also 
 Movies about immigration to Italy

External links 
 

2008 films
2000s Italian-language films
Films about race and ethnicity
Films about interracial romance
2008 romantic comedy-drama films
Films about immigration
Italian romantic comedy-drama films
2008 comedy films
2008 drama films
2000s Italian films